Keedam is a 2022 Indian Malayalam-language thriller film directed by Rahul Riji Nair and starring Rajisha Vijayan and Sreenivasan. The film was released in theatres on 20 May 2022.

Plot
Cybersecurity expert Radhika Balan's life turns chaotic when she falls prey to a cyberstalking incident. She decides to take things into her hands and settle the score with the criminals.

Cast 
Rajisha Vijayan as Radhika Balan 
Sreenivasan as Balan
Vijay Babu as CI Charles
Manikandan Pattambi as Kuttettan
Renjit Shekar Nair as Thurumbu Aji
Anand Manmadhan as Zam
Mahesh Nair as Kili Biju
Rahul Riji Nair as Vijay
Arjun Ranjan as Muthu

Production 
The film's director, Rahul Riji Nair, previously directed the Sports Drama Kho-Kho starring Rajisha Vijayan. In this film, Rajisha Vijayan plays a cyber security expert.

Music
The music rights of the film is owned by Saregama.
The music of the film is composed by Sidhartha Pradeep. Lyrics are written by Vinayak Sasikumar, Neeraj Kumar and Mridul.

Reception 
S. R. Praveen of The Hindu opined that "Setting aside the ethical part, the movie can be viewed positively as one woman’s valiant fightback, using her own tools, against a group of thugs who intrude into her personal space". A critic from Manorama Online wrote that "Nevertheless, Keedam is a mirror on the invasion of privacy and the concerns arising from that portrayed through the prism of cybersecurity, though we wish it could pan a wider canvas". Anna M.M. Vetticad of Firstpost said that "Keedam is, wisely, not prescriptive on the question of technology-driven vigilante justice, but it avoids addressing the complexities involved in the use of surveillance techniques including their misuse by the powers that be". Cris of The News Minute stated that "Even though all the elements are there – a good cast, convincing villains, a setting that fits – the filmmaking falls inadequate".

Release

Theatrical
The film was released in theatres on 20 May 2022.

Home media
The film was digitally streamed on ZEE5 from 1 July 2022.

References